Kingman (1888–1893) was an American Thoroughbred racehorse owned by Kinzea Stone of Georgetown, Kentucky and the winner of the 1891 Kentucky Derby, Phoenix Stakes and Latonia Derby. He holds the record for the slowest winning time ever recorded at a Kentucky Derby, at 2:52. Kingman was ridden in the Derby by Isaac Burns Murphy and was considered one of the best prospects for winning the 1891 American Derby. However, Kingman finished third in that race and won few races of importance thereafter.

Kingman was bought by John E. Madden of Louisville, Kentucky in the latter part of 1891 for $5,000 at the Jacobin Stable dispersal sale. Kingman did not race after three years old and died in 1893 at the age of five.

Pedigree

References

1888 racehorse births
Racehorses bred in the United States
Racehorses trained in the United States
Kentucky Derby winners
Thoroughbred family 23-b
Byerley Turk sire line